This is a list of concert tours by South Korean singer-songwriter and dancer BoA, which is an acronym for Beat of Angel. She is primarily active in South Korea and Japan, and has embarked on numerous concert tours in several countries in Asia. In addition to her tours, she has held various other live shows including Christmas concerts. She is often referred to as the Queen of K-pop.

1st Live Tour: 2003 Valenti

Live Tour 2004: Love & Honesty

Arena Tour 2005: Best Of Soul

BoA The Live 2006

Arena Tour 2007: Made in Twenty (20)

BoA Live Tour 2008: The Face

BoA Live 2010: Identity

BoA Special Live 2013: Here I Am
"Special Live 2013: Here I Am" is BoA's first solo concert in South Korea. It was held on 26 and 27 January at the Olympic Hall in Seoul's Olympic Park. Originally there was only one date for the concert but after the tickets for the first day sold out rapidly, SM Entertainment decided to add another date. On 11 April 2013, 3 more concerts were added to the tour: one in Taiwan and two in South Korea.

BoA The Live 2014: Who's Back?

BoA THE LIVE 2018 〜Unchained〜

BoA Live Tour 2019 #Mood

Other concerts

BoA The Live 2007 X'mas

Best & USA Release Party: Thank You For Your Support!

BoA The Live 2009 X'mas

BoA The Live 2010 X'mas

BoA The Live 2011 X'mas: The 10th Anniversary Edition

BoA 2015 Special Live: Nowness 
"Special Live 2015: Nowness" is BoA's 15th anniversary concert at Sejong Center for the Performing Arts in South Korea. BoA is the first female idol to hold a solo concert at this performing center. Only a few pop singers have ever held a concert at the Sejong Center in its entire history as it does not usually open up its venue to pop music performances.

BoA THE LIVE 2018 "X'mas" 
Billed as BoA THE LIVE 2018 "X'mas" in Japan and BoA THE LIVE 2018 in SEOUL in South Korea.

BoA 20th Anniversary Special Live "The Greatest"

BoA 20th Anniversary Live "The BoA: Musicality"

References 

BoA
BoA
BoA